Basilica of St. Louis may refer to:

Basilica of St. Louis, King of France, built 1834
Cathedral Basilica of Saint Louis, built 1914